HMS Conflict was the lead ship of the s built by J. Samuel White, at East Cowes, Isle of Wight for the Royal Navy.  She was launched on 13 December 1894, and entered service in 1899. After an initial spell in the Mediterranean Fleet, Conflict returned to British waters, where she served the rest of her career. Conflict was part of the Portsmouth Local Defence Flotilla during the First World War, which she survived. Conflict was sold for scrap on 20 May 1920.

Construction and design
On 7 November 1893, the British Admiralty placed an order for three "27-knotter" torpedo boat destroyers (Conflict,  and ) with the shipbuilder J. Samuel White under the 1893–1894 shipbuilding programme for the Royal Navy, with delivery of the three ships to be completed by April 1895. In total, the 1893–1894 programme ordered 36 destroyers from 14 shipbuilders as a follow-on to the six prototype "26-knotter" destroyers ordered under the 1892–1893 programme.

As a torpedo boat, the planned armament was a single QF 12 pounder 12 cwt ( calibre) gun on a platform on the ship's conning tower (in practice the platform was also used as the ship's bridge), together with a secondary gun armament of three 6-pounder guns, and two 18 inch (450 mm) torpedo tubes. As a gunboat, one of the torpedo tubes could be removed to accommodate a further two six-pounders.

Displacement was  light and  full load. Three funnels were fitted.

Conflict was laid down at White's Cowes, Isle of Wight shipyard on 3 January 1894 as Yard number 945 and was launched on 13 December 1894. The three Wight-built destroyers had difficulty meeting their required contract speed of 27 knots, although Conflict was eventually recorded as having reached  during sea trials, and Conflict was not accepted into service until July 1899.

Service history
She arrived at Plymouth on 5 July 1902, and was paid off at Portsmouth on 24 July.

In early 1910, Conflict was a member of the 6th Destroyer Flotilla, based at The Nore, and underwent refit at Chatham Dockyard. On 30 August 1912 the Admiralty directed all destroyers were to be grouped into classes designated by letters based on contract speed and appearance.

In March 1913, Conflict was based at Portsmouth as a tender to the torpedo school HMS Vernon, and listed as in-commission, with a nucleus crew. Conflict remained attached to HMS Vernon in July 1914, although now was listed as being in reserve.

First World War
By 1 November 1914, Conflict was still based at Portsmouth, one of six old destroyers, 17 torpedo boats and four submarines that made up the Local Defence Flotilla for the port. On 24 November 1914, following an attack by the German submarine  on the steamer SS Malachite the previous day, Conflict and the torpedo boat  escorted a transport from Southampton to Le Havre. On 4 June 1917, the torpedo boat  spotted the conning tower and periscope of a submarine off Portsmouth, and made to attack the submarine, which promptly dived. TB 98 dropped two depth charges at the submarine, and when, about an hour later, the torpedo boat sighted a periscope, TB 98 attempted to ram the submarine. Conflict, which was following close behind TB 98, dropped two depth charges. The attacks by TB 98 and Conflict were judged by Naval Intelligence to be "improbable" to have been successful, although the commanding officers of the two ships were mentioned in dispatches.

Conflict was remained part of the Portsmouth Local Defence Flotilla in August 1918, but by December that year, while still part of the flotilla, was listed as being paid off.

Disposal
By January 1920, Conflict was listed as for sale, and the ship was sold on 20 May 1920 to Ward for scrapping at their Milford Haven yard.

Pennant numbers

Notes

References
 
 
 
 
 
 
 
 
 
 

 

Conflict-class destroyers
Ships built on the Isle of Wight
1894 ships
A-class destroyers (1913)
World War I destroyers of the United Kingdom